This is a list of postal entities by country. It includes:
The governmental authority responsible for postal matters.
The regulatory authority for the postal sector. Postal regulation may include the establishment of postal policies, postal rates, postal services offered, budgeting for and financing postal operations. Where no independent postal regulator has been established, these tasks may be undertaken by the government or the operator(s). They may be carried out by a single entity or spread out amongst multiple government, quasi-government or private entities.
 The designated postal operator of that country (normally the public postal service). Notable postal operators other than the designated operator, if any, may also be listed. Postal operations involve the execution of domestic and international postal services to include the receipt, transportation and delivery of authorized classes of mail, specialized mailing services, the operation of postal facilities and the sale of postage, philatelic materials and mailing supplies.

List

UPU members
The following list uses the structure and terminology of the document Status and structures of postal entities in the UPU member countries. This document, published in 2009 by the Universal Postal Union (UPU), contains data for 162 of the 191 countries and territories that were then UPU members. For these countries, which are marked below, the list's contents are based on that document.

Since this document was published, the UPU has had two changes of membership:
 On 10 October 2010, the Netherlands Antilles, which shared a UPU membership with Aruba, was dissolved. Bonaire, Sint Eustatius and Saba, collectively known as the Caribbean Netherlands, became an integral part of the Netherlands. Curaçao and Sint Maarten became constituent countries within the Kingdom of the Netherlands. This UPU entity, formerly "Netherlands Antilles and Aruba", is now known as "Aruba, Curaçao and Sint Maarten".
 South Sudan joined the UPU on 4 October 2011.

Notes

Countries or territories that are not members of the UPU

See also

 List of national postal services
 List of members of the Universal Postal Union
 List of entities that have issued postage stamps: A–E / F–L / M–Z
 List of philatelic bureaus
Articles about postal systems by country, postal organisations by country
 United Nations Postal Administration

References

Further reading
 List of member countries of the Universal Postal Union : showing their contribution class, geographical group and legal situation with regard to the Acts of the Union. Bern: International Bureau of the Universal Postal Union, 2005 13p.

External links
 http://digilander.libero.it/fabioalarici/philbur.html

 
Postal entities